Aīda Niedra (March 23, 1899 – November 23, 1972) was a Latvian writer. She is considered one of the most important Latvian women novelists.

She was born Ida Niedra in Vidzeme. After completing secondary school, she worked as secretary to a justice of the peace in Riga until 1932. She moved to Germany as a war refugee in 1944; in 1949, she emigrated to the United States. She died in Santa Monica, California at the age of 72.

Selected works 
 Erosa elēģijas, poetry (1924)
 Sarkanā vāze, novel (1927)
 Dziesminiece, poetry (1934)
 Sieva, novel (1938)
 Rūžu Kristīne, novel (1939)
 Katrīna Ābele, novel (1950)
 Trīs Caunu sievietes, novel (1954)
 Pērles Majores draugs, novel (1959)

References 

1899 births
1972 deaths
People from Gulbene Municipality
People from the Governorate of Livonia
Latvian poets
Latvian novelists